The 1929 Twickenham by-election was a parliamentary by-election held on 8 August 1929 for the British House of Commons constituency of Twickenham in Middlesex.

Vacancy
The seat had become vacant when the constituency's Conservative Member of Parliament (MP), Sir William Joynson-Hicks, had been elevated to the peerage as Viscount Brentford. He had held the seat since its creation for the 1918 general election.

Candidates
The Liberal Party ran 55-year-old Frederick Graham Paterson. He was a barrister of Gray's Inn, educated at New College, Oxford. He had been Liberal candidate here at the last general election and had previously contested Lowestoft in 1923 and 1924.

Result 
The result was a narrow victory for the Conservative candidate Sir John Ferguson, from whom the Conservative Central Office withdrew support over his advocacy of Empire free trade. Ferguson died in office three years later, triggering the 1932 Twickenham by-election.

See also
 Twickenham constituency
 Twickenham
 1932 Twickenham by-election
 1934 Twickenham by-election
 1955 Twickenham by-election
 List of United Kingdom by-elections

References

 
 

Elections in the London Borough of Richmond upon Thames
By-elections to the Parliament of the United Kingdom in London constituencies
Twickenham
1929 elections in the United Kingdom
1929 in London
20th century in Middlesex
August 1929 events